The Maxie Ford is a tap dance step consisting of four movements: step, shuffle, leap, toe. The Maxie Ford is famous for its use of the pullback (or graboff) after the shuffle and best known as the Maxie Ford Break: 2 executions of the basic Maxie Ford and a stamp:
 The Standard Maxie Ford Break (see the Nicholas Brothers, Henry LeTang and almost every tap teacher)
 The Professional Maxie Ford Break (This form provides an additional pullback after the toe and was a favourite of many dancers (Gene Kelly, the Nicholas Brothers, Coles & Atkins, The Four Step Brothers, Tip, Tap & Toe etc.) Maxie Fords may also be done turning across the floor, such that each one is performed in a single rotation (with or without the pullback)).

References

Dance moves
Tap dance